The Priests (Ordination of Women) Measure 1993 is a Church of England Measure passed by the General Synod of the Church of England enabling the ordination of women in the Church of England.

Both Queen's Consent and Prince's Consent were required to pass the Measure.

It was repealed by Bishops and Priests (Consecration and Ordination of Women) Measure 2014 which enabled the ordination of women as bishops and re-enabled the ordination of women as priests.

Resolutions
To protect those in the Church of England who could not accept the ordination of women as priests, two resolutions were provided.

Resolution A
 "That this parochial church council would not accept a woman as the minister who presides at or celebrates the Holy Communion or pronounces the Absolution in the parish."

Resolution B
 "That this parochial church council would not accept a woman as the incumbent or priest-in-charge of the benefice or as a team vicar for the benefice."

See also
 Alternative Episcopal Oversight (informally "Resolution C")
 Ordination of women in the Anglican Communion
 List of Church of England Measures

References

Church of England legislation
1993 in Christianity
Ordination of women in the Anglican Communion
Royal prerogative
Women's rights in the United Kingdom
1993 in women's history